Thomas Joseph Tynan (born February 25, 1992) is an American professional ice hockey player for the Ontario Reign of the American Hockey League (AHL) while under contract to the Los Angeles Kings of the National Hockey League (NHL). Tynan was selected by the Columbus Blue Jackets in the third round (66th overall) of the 2011 NHL Entry Draft.

Playing career

Tynan played collegiate hockey for the Notre Dame Fighting Irish men's ice hockey team which competed in NCAA's Division I in the Central Collegiate Hockey Association conference and Hockey East for his final year.

On April 1, 2014, the Columbus Blue Jackets of the National Hockey League (NHL) signed Tynan to a two-year entry-level contract. Tynan was assigned to the Springfield Falcons upon completion of Notre Dame's season. Tynan made his NHL debut against the New Jersey Devils on March 8, 2017.

On July 1, 2017, having left the Blue Jackets as a free agent, Tynan agreed to a two-year, two-way contract with expansion club, the Vegas Golden Knights. After attending the Golden Knights inaugural training camp, Tynan was assigned for the duration of the 2017–18 season to the AHL to play with affiliate, the Chicago Wolves. Selected as an Alternate captain, he was used in a top-line role. Tynan placed second to Teemu Pulkkinen in scoring with Chicago, posting 15 goals and 60 points in 70 games.

In the following 2018–19 season, Tynan continued as a staple of the Wolves attack, producing at a point-per-game through 71 regular season appearances and collecting a league leading 59 assists. He added 2 goals and 13 points in 22 post-season games, helping the Chicago Wolves to the Calder Cup Finals, before losing to the Charlotte Checkers.

As a free agent from the Golden Knights, Tynan agreed to one-year, two-way $700,000 contract with the Colorado Avalanche on July 1, 2019. After attending his first training camp with the Avalanche, Tynan was among the last cuts re-assigned to begin the 2019–20 season with AHL affiliate, the Colorado Eagles. Signed to add offensive depth to the organization, Tynan led the Eagles to start the campaign posting 12 points in 10 games before he was recalled to the NHL by Avalanche on November 6, 2019. Returning to the NHL for the first time since March 2017, Tynan re-united with head coach Jared Bednar from their Calder Cup winning tenure with the Cleveland Monsters. He made his Avalanche debut in a 9–4 victory over the Nashville Predators on November 7, 2019.

At the conclusion of his contract with the Avalanche, Tynan left as a free agent to sign a one-year, two-way deal with the Los Angeles Kings on July 28, 2021.

Career statistics

Regular season and playoffs

International

Awards and honors

References

External links
 

1992 births
American men's ice hockey forwards
Chicago Wolves players
Cleveland Monsters players
Colorado Avalanche players
Colorado Eagles players
Columbus Blue Jackets draft picks
Columbus Blue Jackets players
Des Moines Buccaneers players
Ice hockey players from Illinois
Lake Erie Monsters players
Living people
Los Angeles Kings players
Notre Dame Fighting Irish men's ice hockey players
Ontario Reign (AHL) players
Sportspeople from Cook County, Illinois
Springfield Falcons players